Madan (also Romanized as Ma‘dan and Ma’aden) is a village in Mashayekh Rural District of Naghan District, Kiar County, Chaharmahal and Bakhtiari province, Iran. At the 2006 census, its population was 999 in 193 households, when it was in Ardal County. The following census in 2011 counted 1,280 people in 274 households, by which time it was in the newly established Kiar County. The latest census in 2016 showed a population of 1,320 people in 326 households; it was the largest village in its rural district.

References 

Kiar County

Populated places in Chaharmahal and Bakhtiari Province

Populated places in Kiar County